Ustárroz is a locality located in the municipality of Valle de Egüés, in Navarre province, Spain, Spain. As of 2020, it has a population of 13.

Geography 
Ustárroz is located 14km east of Pamplona.

References

Populated places in Navarre